Requetemu is a  NOAA weather station in the Mexican state of San Luis Potosí. It is 89m (292 feet) above sea level.

Footnotes

External links

Meteorological stations